Michael A. Christ is Director of Legislative Affairs for Connecticut Governor Dannel Malloy, as well as an attorney and former Democratic politician from East Hartford, Connecticut. After winning election in 1994 and until 2009, he served the 12th Assembly District for East Hartford and South Windsor in the Connecticut House of Representatives. He was the Deputy Majority Leader in his final two two-year terms. Following his service in government, he "served as Vice President of Government Affairs for United Health Group for the New England region."

He earned his Bachelor of Arts in English from Central Connecticut State University and his J.D. from Western New England College School of Law.

References

External links
Official Website

Year of birth missing (living people)
Living people
People from East Hartford, Connecticut
Central Connecticut State University alumni
Western New England University alumni
Democratic Party members of the Connecticut House of Representatives